London Kills is a British police procedural television series, written and created by Paul Marquess, that premiered on Acorn TV on 26 February 2019 in the United States. One of Acorn TV's first original commissions, London Kills centres around an elite murder investigation squad in London, headed up by DI David Bradford (Hugo Speer), an experienced detective whose judgement is called into question following the unexpected disappearance of his wife.

The series - newly commissioned by AMC Networks for its 4th season  - follows on from Marquess' former London-based police procedural series Suspects, and aside from the cast, features a number of striking similarities, including a documentary-style feel and an ad-lib script allowing the cast to partially improvise their lines based upon a given synopsis.

Outside the United States, the series was originally slated for broadcast on Channel 5, although the broadcaster later pulled out of the deal. The BBC subsequently purchased the first five-episode series for broadcast as part of their daytime schedule, and began broadcasting episodes daily at 1:45pm from 24 June 2019.  The first series was released on Region 2 DVD on 1 July 2019. Series 1 was released in Australia (Region 4) on 6 May 2020. The second series premiered in the United States on 15 July 2019.

Cast
 Hugo Speer as Detective Inspector David Bradford: head of the Metropolitan Police Murder Investigation Team
 Sharon Small as Detective Sergeant Vivienne Cole:
 Bailey Patrick as Rob Brady: senior Detective Constable and seasoned investigator
 Tori Allen-Martin as  Billie Fitzgerald: trainee detective constable and the youngest member of David's team
 Jennie Jacques as Amber Saunders (series 1): a homeless witness who befriends Billie
 Maimie McCoy as Grace Harper (series 2): witness under the protection of Detective Inspector David Bradford
 John Michie plays Detective Chief Superintendent Jack Mulgrew (series 3)
 Benjamin O'Mahony as Sergeant Ian Durrant (series 3)

Episodes

Series 1 (2019)

Series 2 (2019)

Series 3 (2022)

Home Media

References

External links 
 
 

2019 British television series debuts
2010s British crime drama television series
2010s British mystery television series
2010s British police procedural television series
2010s British workplace drama television series
2020s British crime drama television series
2020s British mystery television series
2020s British police procedural television series
2020s British workplace drama television series
BBC crime drama television shows
BBC high definition shows
BBC mystery television shows
English-language television shows
Murder in television
Television shows set in London